Cerro Quiac (Kʼiaq  and Kʼiaqbʼal  in the Kʼicheʼ language) is a small Maya archaeological site located at an altitude of , overlooking the Plains of Urbina in the Guatemalan Highlands. When investigated in 1970 it had five stone sculptures, by 1977 only four were left. The sculptures included figures and geometric decoration. The site is still used for contemporary Maya rituals. Cerro Quiac is located in the northeast of the municipality of Cantel, within the boundaries of the hamlet of Chirijquiac.

Cerro Quiac contains two small groups of pre-Columbian architecture. An ethnohistoric document from the early Colonial period describes the site as a fortress founded by the Mam Maya, who were subsequently driven from the area by Kʼicheʼ expansion. Cerro Quiac has been dated to the Early Postclassic period of Mesoamerican chronology (approximately 900–1200 AD). Local Kʼicheʼ folklore holds that the archaeological site was a training ground for Kʼicheʼ warriors, and that the Kʼicheʼ hero Tecun Uman died upon the hill.

Etymology
The name of the hill is variously said to be derived either from the Kʼicheʼ word kʼiaq, meaning "flea", or from the name of a small black flower that grows on the hill. Cerro means "hill" in Spanish. The name k'iaqb'al for the archaeological site means "place of throwing/shooting".

Location
The summit of the hill is covered with pine forest. The hill is steep-sided, with the easiest approach from the northeast, the direction furthest from the pre-Columbian remains.

Site description

The site architecture was built on the western portion of the ridge, running approximately northwest to southeast. There are two architectural groups, both of which are poorly preserved.

The east group possesses three earthwork mounds arranged in a line, with a fourth mound situated off to the south side. There are steep drops on the east and west sides. Plentiful ceramic remains were scattered around the group, which had been exposed by agricultural activity.

The walls of the platform were built from uncut stone. Five prehispanic stelae stood upon the platform in the 1970s.

It is possible that they were brought to Cerro Quiac from various other sites in the area. The sculptures were badly eroded. A number of pre-Columbian tombs were found on the hill, and various artefacts were recovered.

History

Recovered ceramics date the site to the Early Postclassic period of Mesoamerican chronology (c. 950–1200 AD). The early colonial Kʼicheʼ document entitled Título C'oyoi describes the site as a fortress built by the Mam Maya of Zaculeu. There is no archaeological evidence of occupation after the Mam were driven from the site by Kʼicheʼ expansion. The ceramics and stelae are likely to be Mam in origin, and to date to the 13th or 14th century AD.

Modern history
In September 1884, during the presidency of Justo Rufino Barrios, two government artillery pieces were placed on Cerro Quiac in order to threaten Cantel with bombardment, and enforce compliance with government demands for money. In folk memory, this event has been conflated with local resistance to the construction of a textile factory, and central government threats to bombard the local populace into acceptance.

In 1968, during the Guatemalan Civil War, the municipal authorities of Quetzaltenango attempted to purchase the hill to build a military barracks there, but were resisted by the inhabitants of Cantel, who refused to sell the land. As a communal response, the locals argued that Cerro Quiac was an archaeological site, and the various churches of Cantel united to establish the hill as an ecumenical prayer ground. The site is the most important Maya ceremonial site in Cantel. On 28 June 2004, it was declared a site of national cultural and natural heritage by ministerial accord.

Folklore

In local folklore, the hill was formed by an eruption of the Cerro Quemado volcano. The great leap from Cerro Quemado to the hill is said to be the origin of its name, K'iaq, as the leap of a flea. Traditionally, the archaeological site was called Kʼiaqbal, and is said to have been a training ground for Kʼicheʼ warriors. The hill is also linked in local folklore to the Kʼicheʼ hero Tecun Uman, and his battle against Pedro de Alvarado during the Spanish conquest of Guatemala. According to one account, Tecun Uman was killed on the hill.

See also
 Chojolom

Notes

References

Ajtún Chanchavac, Mario (2011) Aldea Chirijquiac, Cantel 2011 (in Spanish) (Guatemala: Alcaldía Comunitaria de Cantel). Archived from the original on 2016-03-06.
Carmack, Robert M.; and James L. Mondloch (2009). Horacio Cabezas Carcache, ed. "Título K'oyoi". Crónicas Mesoamericanas (in Spanish) (Guatemala City, Guatemala: Universidad Mesoamericana). Volume II: 15–68. . . Archived from the original on 2016-03-01. Access date 2016-03-01.
CENADOJ (15 July 2004) Sumario Diario de Centro América del jueves 15 de julio de 2004 (in Spanish) (Guatemala City, Guatemala: Organismo Judicial: Centro Nacional de Análisis y Documentación Judicial (CENADOJ)). Retrieved on 2016-03-04.
Christenson, Allen J. "Kʼicheʼ–English Dictionary and Guide to Pronunciation of the Kʼicheʼ-Maya Alphabet" (PDF). Foundation for the Advancement of Mesoamerican Studies, Inc. (FAMSI). Retrieved 2016-03-07.
Ciudad Ruiz, Andrés; and María Josefa Iglesias Ponce de León (1995). J. P. Laporte, and H. Escobedo, eds. "Arqueología del occidente de Guatemala: Estado actual y perspectivas del futuro" [Archaeology in Western Guatemala: Current state and future perspectives] (PDF). Simposio de Investigaciones Arqueológicas en Guatemala (in Spanish) (Guatemala City, Guatemala: Museo Nacional de Arqueología y Etnología. VIII (1994): 90–101. . Archived from the original on 2011-09-14. Retrieved 2016-02-29.
Colop, Sam (5 October 2002) Ucha Xik Ri K'iaq: Ahora la cúspide del domo volcánico es un centro ceremonial ecuménico, Prensa Libre (in Spanish). Guatemala City, Guatemala. 
Cornejo Sam, Mariano. Q'antel (Cantel): Patrimonio cultural-histórico del pueblo de Nuestra Señora de la Asunción Cantel: Tzion'elil echba'l kech aj kntelab "Tierra de Viento y Neblina" (in Spanish). Quetzaltenango, Guatemala.
DeSalvo, Lyndon (2008) "Bleeding Earth: Volcanoes as the Prototypical Mountains in Mayan Cosmological Past". Northfield, Minnesota, US: Carleton College. Archived from the original on 2016-03-06. Retrieved on 2016-03-04.
Fox, John W. (1978) Quiche Conquest: Centralism and Regionalism in Highland Guatemalan State Development, pp. 162–166. Albuquerque, New Mexico, US: University of New Mexico Press. . .
Iglesias Ponce de León, María Josefa; and Andrés Ciudad Ruiz (1984). "Exploraciones arqueológicas en la cuenca alta del río Samalá (Guatemala)" [Archaeological exploration in the upper Samala River basin (Guatemala)] (PDF). Revista española de antropología americana (in Spanish) (Madrid, Spain: Universidad Complutense de Madrid). Nº 14 (1984): 9–32. ISSN 0556-6533. Archived from the original on 2016-02-29. Retrieved 2016-02-29.
Little-Siebold, Todd (1998). "Monografías, memoria y la producción local de historia" [Monographs, Memory, and the Production of Local History] (PDF). Mesoamérica (in Spanish). (Wellflett, Massachusetts, US: Plumsock Mesoamerican Studies) Vol 36 (December 1998): 343–369. ISSN 0252-9963. Archived from the original on 2016-03-01. Retrieved 2016-03-01.
Pye, C. 1991. The Acquisition of K'iche' (Maya) (1991), in Dan Isaac Slobin (Ed.), The Crosslinguistic Study of Language Acquisition, Vol. 3, pp. 221–308. Hillsdale, New Jersey, US: Erlbaum.  Retrieved 2016-03-07.
Span¡shD!ct. www.spanishdict.com. Curiosity Media. Retrieved 2016-03-03.

External links

 Cerro Quiac record card at CIRMA 

Maya sites in Guatemala
Quetzaltenango Department
K'iche'
Mam Maya
Maya Postclassic Period